Baeckea utilis, commonly known as mountain baeckea, is a species of flowering plant in the family Myrtaceae and is endemic to south-eastern continental Australia. It is a shrub with elliptic to lance-shaped leaves with the narrower end towards the base and white flowers, usually with eight stamens.

Description

Taxonomy
Baeckea utilis was first formally described in 1856 by Friedrich Anton Wilhelm Miquel in Nederlandsch Kruidkundig Archief from an unpublished description by Ferdinand von Mueller. The specific epithet (utilis) means "useful".

Distribution and habitat
Mountain baeckea grows in heath, forest or alpine herbfields and is common at higher altitudes south from Dorrigo in New South Wales, through the Australian Capital Territory to eastern Victoria.

References

Flora of New South Wales
Flora of the Australian Capital Territory
Flora of Victoria (Australia)
utilis
Plants described in 1856
Taxa named by Friedrich Anton Wilhelm Miquel